The 1996–97 season of the Slovak Second Football League (also known as 2. liga) was the fourth season of the league since its establishment. It began in late July 1996 and ended in June 1997.

League standing

See also
1996–97 Slovak Superliga

References
 Jindřich Horák, Lubomír Král: Encyklopedie našeho fotbalu, Libri 1997
 Igor Mráz: Päť rokov futbalu, SFZ 1998

2. Liga (Slovakia) seasons
2
Slovak